A hallucination is a perception in the absence of a stimulus.

Hallucination or Hallucinations may also refer to:

Literature
 "Hallucination" (short story), a 1985 science fiction short story by Isaac Asimov
 Hallucinations (short story), a 1997 science fiction horror short story by Junji Ito
 Hallucinations (book), a 2012 book by Oliver Sacks

Computing and mathematics
 Hallucination (artificial intelligence)  or "artificial hallucination" is a confident response by an artificial intelligence that does not seem to be justified by its training data.

Music
 Hallucination Recordings, a record label
 Hallucinations (Atrocity album) (1990)
 Hallucinations (David Usher album) (2003)
 Hallucinations (EP), a 2019 EP by Pvris
 Hallucinations: Psychedelic Pop Nuggets from the WEA Vaults, a 2004 compilation album
 "Hallucinations", a 2009 single by Angels & Airwaves from Love
 "Hallucinations", a bebop-era composition by Bud Powell covered by many jazz musicians

See also